This is a list of diplomatic missions of Liberia, excluding honorary consulates.

Africa

 Cairo (Embassy)

 Addis Ababa (Embassy)

 Accra (Embassy)

 Conakry (Embassy)

 Abidjan (Embassy)

 Tripoli (Embassy)

 Rabat (Embassy)

 Abuja (Embassy)

 Dakar (Embassy)

 Freetown (Embassy)

 Pretoria (Embassy)

Americas

 Washington, D.C. (Embassy)
 New York City (Consulate-General)

Asia

 Beijing (Embassy)

 Tokyo (Embassy)

 Kuwait City (Embassy)

 Doha (Embassy)

 Riyadh (Embassy)

Europe

 Brussels (Embassy)

 Paris (Embassy)

 Berlin (Embassy)

 Rome (Embassy)

 London (Embassy)

Multilateral organizations
 African Union
Addis Ababa (Permanent Mission to the African Union)

Brussels (Mission to the European Union)

Geneva (Permanent Mission to the United Nations and international organizations)
New York (Permanent Mission to the United Nations)

Paris (Permanent Mission to UNESCO)

Gallery

See also
 Foreign relations of Liberia
 List of diplomatic missions in Liberia
 Visa policy of Liberia
 Visa requirements for Liberian citizens

References

Ministry of Foreign Affairs of Liberia

Diplomatic missions
Liberia